Elaine G. Toms is a Canadian information scientist working in human–computer interaction and known for her research on information retrieval, usability of web sites, and the measurement of user engagement. She is Professor of Information Innovation & Management at the Sheffield University Management School, part of the University of Sheffield in England.

Education and career
Toms was a student at Dalhousie University, and completed a Ph.D. in 1997 at the University of Western Ontario.

Toms was president of the Canadian Association for Information Science for 1998–1999.  After four years in the Faculty of Information Studies at the University of Toronto, she returned to Dalhousie in 2004, as associate professor and Canada Research Chair in Management Informatics. She moved from Dalhousie to Sheffield in 2011.

References

External links

Year of birth missing (living people)
Living people
British computer scientists
Canadian computer scientists
Women computer scientists
Information scientists
Human–computer interaction researchers
Dalhousie University alumni
University of Western Ontario alumni
Academic staff of the University of Toronto
Academic staff of the Dalhousie University
Academics of the University of Sheffield